Niels Hahn (born 24 May 2001) is an Austrian professional footballer who plays as midfielder for 2. Liga club Young Violets, the reserve squad of Austria Wien.

References

2001 births
Living people
Association football midfielders
Austrian footballers
Austria youth international footballers
FK Austria Wien players
Austrian Football Bundesliga players
2. Liga (Austria) players